Amaurobius occidentalis is a species of spider in the family Amaurobiidae, found in south-west Europe (Portugal, Spain and France).

References

occidentalis
Spiders of Europe
Spiders described in 1892